"Don't Think of Me" is a song by English singer-songwriter Dido. It was released as the second single from her debut album, No Angel (1999), exclusively in the United States on 7 February 2000. The single gained enough airplay to peak at number 35 on the US Billboard Adult Top 40 in May 2000. "Don't Think of Me" also charted in Romania in 2002, peaking at number 62 that June.

Track listing
US promo CD
 "Don't Think of Me" (radio mix) – 3:56
 "Don't Think of Me" (album edit) – 4:18
 Call out research hook – 0:10

Credits and personnel
Credits are lifted from the US promo CD and the No Angel album booklet.

Studio
 Mastered at Sterling Sound (New York City)

Personnel

 Dido – writing (as Dido Armstrong), all vocals
 Rollo Armstrong – writing
 Pauline Taylor – writing, additional background vocals
 Paul Herman – writing, guitar
 Youth – bass, production
 Mark Bates – piano
 Geoff Dugmore – live drums and percussion
 Wil Malone – string arrangement
 Gavyn Wright – string leader
 Jony Rockstar – programming

 Hugo Nicolson – recording, mixing (album version)
 Tom Lord-Alge – mixing (radio mix)
 Tom Coyne – mastering
 Sheri G. Lee – art direction
 Andrew Southam – photography
 Len Irish – interior photography
 Basia Zamorska – styling
 Laura De Leon – hair
 Heidi Lee – makeup

Charts

References

2000 singles
1999 songs
Arista Records singles
Bertelsmann Music Group singles
Cheeky Records singles
Dido (singer) songs
Songs written by Dido (singer)
Songs written by Pauline Taylor
Songs written by Rollo Armstrong